Qarah Gonay-e Vosta (also Romanized as Qarah Gonay-e Vosţá and Qareh Gonay-e Vosţá; also known as Qareh Gonāy and Qareh Gūney-ye Vosţá) is a village in Charuymaq-e Sharqi Rural District, Shadian District, Charuymaq County, East Azerbaijan Province, Iran. At the 2006 census, its population was 221, in 40 families.

References 

Populated places in Charuymaq County